Poland women's national under-17 football team is the football team representing Poland in competitions for under-17 year old players and is controlled by the Polish Football Association. The team has never qualified for the FIFA U-17 Women's World Cup. There are the 2013 UEFA Women's Under-17 Championship winners.

Competitive record

FIFA U-17 Women's World Cup

The team has never qualified

UEFA Women's Under-17 Championship

The team has qualified in 2013

References

U17
Women's national under-17 association football teams